The 2016 Women's EuroHockey Indoor Nations Championship was the 17th second edition. It took place from 22 to 24 January 2016 in Minsk, Belarus.

The Netherlands won their second title by defeating Poland 6–2 in the final.

All times are local (UTC+3).

Qualified teams
The following teams participated in the 2016 EuroHockey Indoor Nations Championship.

Results

Preliminary round

Pool A

Pool B

Classification round

Fifth to eighth place classification

Pool C
The result between the teams from the same preliminary round pool were carried over.

First to fourth place classification

Semi-finals

Third and fourth place

Final

Statistics

Final standings

Goalscorers

References

2016
International women's field hockey competitions hosted by Belarus
2016 in women's field hockey
2016 in Belarusian sport
Sports competitions in Minsk
Women 1